The 2017 Serbian Cup is the 12th edition of the tournament.

Schedule
The rounds of the 2017 competition are scheduled as follows:

Matches

Round of 32
Round of 32 match was played on 8 November 2017.

|}

Round of 16
Round of 16 matches were played on 19–22 November 2017.

|}

Quarter-final
Quarter-final matches were played on 1–2 December 2017.

|}

Final four
The final four will be held on 16 and 17 December 2017 at the SC „Đorđe Predin Badža" in Bečej.

Semi-finals

Final

Final standings

References

External links
 Serbian Water Polo Federaration

Serbian Water Polo Cup
Serbian Water Polo Cup Men